State Road 504 (SR 504), also known as the Flatbush Avenue Connector, is a highway in Connecticut that runs  within the city of Hartford.  Its southern terminus is an intersection with Flatbush Avenue and the northern terminus is the interchange with Interstate 84 (I-84) and US Highway 6 (US 6)  at exit 45.  The entire length of SR 504 is a two-lane freeway.

Route description
The Flatbush Avenue Connector starts at an intersection with Flatbush Avenue. The roadway runs northward alongside a creek as a limited-access highway. After  through wooded suburban surroundings, the single northbound lane merges into  eastbound I-84/US 6.

History
SR 504 was once planned to be a short freeway to connect with the Berlin Turnpike (U.S. Route 5 and Route 15) near the South Meadows Expressway connector.  This was once planned as part of the old planned Route 9 freeway (renumbered to the planned Route 189 freeway in 1963).  Route 9 was moved westward and Route 189 never made it south from north side of Hartford.  In 1963, however, the state proposed the corridor as the Cedar Ridge Connector  with no number, leading from its current terminus at I-84 to U.S. 5/Route 15 in Wethersfield.  The short expressway planned to include an interchange with a planned but cancelled Route 71 expressway leading to New Britain.

Circa 2015, the viaduct carrying the northbound ramp to Eastbound I-84 was removed, and a new alignment adjacent to the southbound off ramp from Westbound I-84 was built.

Future
Exit 45 is currently an incomplete interchange, with ramps only for I-84 westbound to SR 504 (left exit) and Route 504 onto I-84 eastbound.  The latest plans for the region include completing the interchange, providing access to points west, and moving a ramp to eliminate the left exit.  Instead of creating a fully directional interchange, the state might build a diamond interchange or variant, and possibly open up surface access from the north.

Junction list

See also

References

External links

State highways in Connecticut
Two-lane freeways in the United States
Transportation in Hartford, Connecticut